The 1955 UCLA Bruins football team was an American football team that represented the University of California, Los Angeles during the 1955 college football season.  In their seventh year under head coach Red Sanders, the Bruins compiled a 9–2 record (6–0 conference) and finished in first place in the Pacific Coast Conference.

The November 12 game against Washington was referenced in the 1989 film, Back to the Future Part II; The older Biff Tannen traveled back in time to give his younger self a sports almanac, and he referenced this game to verify its accuracy.

Schedule

References

UCLA
UCLA Bruins football seasons
Pac-12 Conference football champion seasons
UCLA Bruins football
UCLA Bruins football